What's Buzzin', Cousin? is a 1943 American musical film directed by Charles Barton and written by Harry Sauber and John P. Medbury. The film stars Ann Miller, Eddie "Rochester" Anderson, John Hubbard, Freddy Martin, Leslie Brooks and Jeff Donnell. The film was released on July 8, 1943, by Columbia Pictures.

Plot

Cast          
Ann Miller as Ann Crawford
Eddie "Rochester" Anderson as Rochester
John Hubbard as Jimmy Ross
Freddy Martin as Freddy Martin
Leslie Brooks as Josie
Jeff Donnell as Billie
Carol Hughes as May
Theresa Harris as Blossom
Roy Gordon as Jim Langford
Bradley Page as Pete Hartley
Warren Ashe as Dick Bennett
Dub Taylor as Jed
Betsy Gay as Saree
Louis Mason as Hillbilly
Eugene Jackson as Bellboy
Jessie Arnold as Mrs. Hillbilly
Erville Alderson as Gas Station Attendant
Harry Tyler as Harry
Walter Soderling as Mr. Hayes
Leslie Brooks as Josie (uncredited)

References

External links
 

1943 films
1940s English-language films
American musical films
1943 musical films
Columbia Pictures films
Films directed by Charles Barton
American black-and-white films
1940s American films